Elizabeth A. Breadon is a Democratic member of the Boston City Council who serves the Allston and Brighton neighborhoods (District 9) of Boston, Massachusetts. She is a Northern Ireland immigrant, physical therapist and the first openly LGBTQ woman elected to Boston City Council.

Early life and education 
Breadon grew up in County Fermanagh, Northern Ireland, during The Troubles. She attended Ulster University to study physical therapy. She later worked at the National Health Service. Breadon later attended the defunct Teleosis Homeopathic School in Newton, Massachusetts to study Homeopathy.

Career 
Breadon immigrated to Boston in 1995 and worked for Boston Medical Center, The Home for Little Wanderers, and Perkins School for the Blind.

She has a Doctorate of Physical Therapy from Simmons University. Prior to her election to the Boston City Council, she ran a homeopathy business from 2011 to 2020, where she claimed to be board certified in Classical Homeopathy, a pseudoscientific system of alternative medicine.

City Council 
After coming in second in a seven-way primary to fill the District 9 seat of retiring incumbent Mark Ciommo, Breadon won the 2019 general municipal election with 58.5% of the vote.

Personal life 
Breadon lives in the Oak Square area of Brighton with her spouse, Mary McCarthy.

Election results

2021

2019

References 

Year of birth missing (living people)
Living people
Northern Ireland emigrants to the United States
Boston City Council members
Women city councillors in Massachusetts
Alumni of Ulster University
Simmons University alumni
21st-century American politicians
21st-century American women politicians